The 1897 Colonial Conference was a conference between the Secretary of State for the Colonies and the 11 self-governing colonies of the British Empire. The conference was convened in London by Colonial Secretary Joseph Chamberlain in 1897 on the occasion of Diamond Jubilee of Queen Victoria. Chamberlain's intention was to draw the self-governing colonies into closer co-operation with the United Kingdom.

Delegates were sent to the conference by Canada, Newfoundland Colony, New Zealand the Australian self-governing colonies of New South Wales, Queensland, South Australia, Tasmania, Victoria and Western Australia, and the South African colonies of Cape Colony and the Colony of Natal.

Chamberlain proposed the creation of a permanent Imperial Council made up of delegates from the colonies to act as an Empire-wide parliament with the power to bind the colonies on imperial matters but this was rejected by the colonies due to fears of loss of autonomy. Chamberlain also propose that colonies increase their contributions to the Royal Navy but only some colonies agreed to increase their contributions and no permanent arrangement was agreed to.

Chamberlain also proposed a customs union between the colonies and Britain while Canada proposed preferential trade but no decision was made by the delegates.

Participants
The conference was hosted by Queen Victoria, with her Colonial Secretary and the premiers of various colonies:

See also
Imperial Conference

References

External links
Minutes of the 1911 Imperial Conference

Imperial Conference
1897 in London
Colonial Conference
19th-century diplomatic conferences
1897 conferences
1897 in the British Empire
June 1897 events
July 1897 events